Ernest William Currie (9 April 1873 – 23 October 1932) was a New Zealand-born rugby union international for Australia and a first-class cricketer.

Cricket career
Currie, who was born in Dunedin, represented Otago in six first-class cricket matches during the 1894/95 and 1893/94 New Zealand cricket seasons, as a wicket-keeper. He was regarded as one of New Zealand's best wicket-keepers of his time, "a lightning hand behind the sticks".

After moving to Australia, he appeared in one further first-class match for Queensland, against New South Wales at the Sydney Cricket Ground in 1899.

Rugby union career
Currie, a scrum-half, claimed one international rugby cap for Australia. He played against Great Britain, at Brisbane, on 22 July 1899, the second ever Test match played by an Australian national side. His performance in that match was noted as "excellent" by the press.

Personal life
He and his wife Annie had a son and two daughters.

See also
 List of Otago representative cricketers

References

External links
Cricinfo: Ernest Currie

1873 births
1932 deaths
Australian cricketers
New Zealand cricketers
Otago cricketers
Queensland cricketers
Australian rugby union players
Australia international rugby union players
Rugby union players from Dunedin
Cricketers from Dunedin
Wicket-keepers
Rugby union scrum-halves